The 2018 Chinese Grand Prix (formally known as the Formula 1 2018 Heineken Chinese Grand Prix) was a Formula One motor race that took place on 15 April 2018 at the Shanghai International Circuit in Shanghai, China. The race was the 3rd round of the 2018 FIA Formula One World Championship, and marked the 15th time that the Chinese Grand Prix has been run as a round of the Formula One World Championship.

Mercedes driver Lewis Hamilton was the defending race winner. Sebastian Vettel entered the round with a 17-point lead over Hamilton in the World Drivers' Championship. His team, Ferrari, led Mercedes by ten points in the World Constructors' Championship. Vettel qualified on pole position, and in doing so recorded Ferrari's first pole position in China in fourteen years. Daniel Ricciardo won the race ahead of Valtteri Bottas and Kimi Räikkönen. Vettel's championship lead was cut to nine points when he finished in eighth place, the result of contact with Max Verstappen late in the race.

Report

Practice 
Lewis Hamilton was quickest in FP1 and FP2. Sebastian Vettel was quickest in FP3. During FP3, Daniel Ricciardo's turbo failed, requiring a full rebuild.

Qualifying 
Daniel Ricciardo's pit crew, still frantically assembling his Red Bull engine and car as qualifying began, were able to get his car out in Q1 with just over three minutes left in the session. With his first and only possible hot lap in Q1, he finished the session in P14. Charles Leclerc, meanwhile, spun his Sauber, and failed to make it out of Q1. Marcus Ericsson was given a 5 place grid penalty for the race, and 3 points on his super license, for ignoring the double yellow flags waved for Leclerc. After qualifying P6 in Bahrain, Pierre Gasly also failed to make it out of Q1.

Ferrari locked out the front row of the grid for the second consecutive race, the first time since 2006 that the team had achieved this feat. Sebastian Vettel qualified on pole position with a time of 1:31.095, a new track record. Mercedes locked out the second row of the grid, and Red Bull the third.

Race 
Polesitter Sebastian Vettel got away well at the start, however his teammate Kimi Räikkönen lost positions, being overtaken by Bottas in Turn 1, and then Verstappen a few corners later. Hamilton fell back to 5th, whilst Ricciardo held 6th. After the first pit stops, Bottas managed to undercut Vettel and subsequently overtook Kimi Räikkönen, who had not yet stopped, for the lead, around the outside in Turn 1. After Bottas blocked off Räikkönen, Vettel took advantage to take second place.

On Lap 30, the Toro Rosso cars of Brendon Hartley and Pierre Gasly collided at the hairpin. Gasly was awarded a 10-second penalty and the debris left on the track resulted in the safety car being brought out. This was a critical turning point for the race, as during the safety car period, both Red Bull cars pitted for fresh tyres on the same lap immediately. Mercedes had an opportunity to bring Hamilton in, but instead left him out to preserve track position. Bottas maintained the lead of the race at the safety car restart. Max Verstappen ran wide on Lap 39 whilst battling with Lewis Hamilton for third place, losing a position to Ricciardo, who had previously overtaken Räikkönen. Both Red Bulls then overtook Hamilton, two laps apart, and then Ricciardo overtook Vettel for P2. On Lap 43, Max Verstappen shunted Sebastian Vettel off the track at the hairpin, resulting in both drivers spinning off the track and Vettel losing positions, due to a damaged floor. Verstappen was awarded a 10-second penalty for the incident. On Lap 45 Ricciardo overtook Bottas for the lead of the race, which he would retain until the chequered flag. On the penultimate lap, Vettel was overtaken by Fernando Alonso meaning he would finish in P8.

Ricciardo celebrated by drinking champagne from his boot on the podium. Chris Gent, Red Bull team number one mechanic joined him on the podium to receive the winning manufacturer's award.

Classification

Qualifying

Notes
  – Marcus Ericsson was given a five-place grid penalty for ignoring yellow flags during qualifying.

Race

Notes
  – Max Verstappen originally finished in fourth place, but had ten seconds added to his race time for causing an avoidable collision.
  – Pierre Gasly originally finished in fifteenth place, but had ten seconds added to his race time for causing an avoidable collision.
  – Brendon Hartley did not finish the race, but was classified as he completed 90% of the winner's race distance.

Championship standings after the race 

Drivers' Championship standings

Constructors' Championship standings

 Note: Only the top five positions are included for both sets of standings.

References

External links

 The race on the official Formula One website

Chinese
Chinese Grand Prix
Grand Prix
Chinese Grand Prix